Philip Jonathan Clifford Mould  (born March 1960) is an English art dealer, London gallery owner, art historian, writer and broadcaster. He has made a number of major art discoveries, including works of Thomas Gainsborough, Anthony Van Dyck and Thomas Lawrence.

Mould is the author of two books on art discovery and is widely consulted by the media on the subject. He co-presents the BBC television programme Fake or Fortune?, an arts programme, with journalist and broadcaster Fiona Bruce.

Early life and education 

Mould was born in Wirral, Cheshire and educated at Kingsmead School, Hoylake, Worth School and the University of East Anglia, from which he graduated with a BA in History of Art in 1981.

Mould's father owned a factory in Liverpool and his family was based in the Wirral Peninsula. Mould made friends with the owner of a local antiques shop, who taught him to read hallmarks on silver when he was just 11 or 12 years old, and by the age of 14 he was dealing in antique silver.

Career

Mould began art dealing in his early teens and has since established an art dealership specialising in British art, a subject on which he is internationally consulted. He has sold works to public institutions such as The Metropolitan Museum of Art (New York), National Portrait Gallery (London), Museum of Fine Arts Boston, Tate, The Huntington Library (California), and the Royal Albert Memorial Museum.

Mould has worked as a valuer for the Heritage Lottery Fund and the Government's Acceptance in Lieu scheme. Between 1988 and 2010 he acted as honorary art adviser to the House of Commons and the House of Lords. He is president of the charity Kids in Museums, president and ex-chairman of Plantlife International, a patron of Fight for Sight, and a trustee and director of the Tony Banks Memorial Trust for the acquisition of historical works for museums. Mould is also a supporter of CleanupUK, and Pond Conservation. He was elected as a fellow of the Linnean Society in 2012.

Mould has made a number of major art discoveries, including some of Thomas Gainsborough's earliest known works, the only known portrait of Arthur, Prince of Wales and lost works by Anthony van Dyck and Thomas Lawrence. In January 2021, Mould found a miniature portrait of French king Henri III by Jean Decourt.

Mould is a regular broadcaster, reviewer and writer for the national press.  His television work includes writing and presenting the Channel 4 series Changing Faces, and featuring as an expert on the Antiques Roadshow. In 2011, he began co-hosting the television programme Fake or Fortune? with Fiona Bruce. Fake or Fortune? has regularly drawn an audience of 5 million. He has authored two critically acclaimed books on art discovery.

In recognition of his art world expertise and contribution to portrait heritage he was created OBE in the 2005 New Year Honours list. For his achievements in his field, as well as his involvement with numerous charities and broadcasting, Mould received an honorary doctorate in July 2013 at his former university, the University of East Anglia. In 2019, he received the EVCOM (Event and Visual Communication Association) Fellowship award. The citation stated "His expertise has shaped our understanding and knowledge of art today, and how we communicate about it."

In January 2014, Mould warned of the increasing prevalence of what he termed "trapping" in which crooked sellers misleadingly hint that fake artworks have genuine provenance, without actually making false descriptions or asserting attributions.

Personal life 
Mould and his wife, Catherine, have a son born in 1997. Since 2002 they have owned Duck End House in Oxfordshire, close to Chipping Norton. The property was once owned by the seventeenth-century politician Sir William Cope. False allegations against Philip Mould of infidelity and financial insolvency were planted in newspapers by a rival art dealer.

In August 2014, Mould was one of 200 public figures who were signatories to a letter to The Guardian opposing Scottish independence in the run-up to September's referendum on that issue. In October 2015, Mould appeared on BBC's Gardeners' World, in the garden of his home, discussing his passion for nature and talked of his interest in varieties of rose which would have been grown in the time of Sir Anthony van Dyck. He also discussed the work of one of his favourite artists, Cedric Morris, who was also a great plantsman. Mould is a keen collector of Morris's work (for his private collection), and champions modern British artists in general; he cites the Bloomsbury Group amongst his favourites.

In April 2020, during the COVID-19 pandemic, Mould started recording a series of short videos he calls Art in Isolation, where the viewer is invited into his home of Duck End and given personal musings on one of his collected artworks.

He is president of the wild plant conservation charity Plantlife.

Bibliography 
 , retitled in paperback as... 
 , retitled for US edition as... 
 Exhibition 18 April – 22 July 2018

References

External links 
 
 
 
 
 Philip Mould, The Art Detective at NPR.org
 At home in Oxfordshire with the art dealer and broadcaster Philip Mould at House & Garden, first published 2013

1960 births
Living people
People educated at Worth School
Alumni of the University of East Anglia
English art dealers
Officers of the Order of the British Empire
BBC people
Fellows of the Linnean Society of London
Fake or Fortune?
People from the Metropolitan Borough of Wirral